Nitu Chandra is an Indian actress, film producer and theatre artist. She is also a classical dancer and a sportsperson, involved in the promotion of basketball in the country through her close association with the NBA and Taekwondo, being a fourth Dan black-belt. She has her own production house named Champaran Talkies, winning the National Award for the film Mithila Makhaan. The national award-winning film was directed by her brother Nitin Chandra.

Early life and education
Chandra's mother tongue is Bhojpuri. She was educated at the Notre Dame Academy, Patna and completed her undergraduate education at Delhi's Indraprastha College. She started modelling and Nitu gives credit of her success to her mother, a native of East Champaran in Bihar. She has appeared in several advertisements and videos for firms since her graduation. She holds two Dan black belts in Taekwondo and represented India in the 1997 World Taekwondo Championships in Hong Kong.

Chandra's brother is Nitin Chandra who directed the movie Deswa.

Acting career
Chandra debuted in the Hindi film industry in 2005 with Garam Masala in which she portrayed the role of Sweety, an air-hostess. She also acted in Godavari, a Telugu film, in 2006. In 2007 she appeared in Madhur Bhandarkar's film, Traffic Signal.

In 2008, she had four releases, being directed by Dibakar Banerjee, Rahul Dholakia, Ashwini Dheer and Vikram. Her Tamil film, Yavarum Nalam with Madhavan, released in 2009, was declared a major hit. In 2010 she was seen in four Hindi films, Rann, Apartment, No Problem, in which she made a special appearance, and Sadiyaan, and one Tamil film, Theeradha Vilaiyattu Pillai.

In 2011 Deswa, a Bhojpuri film which she produced and which was directed by her brother, was released.

In 2013, she acted in the Tamil-language action film Ameerin Aadhi-Bhagavan alongside Jayam Ravi. She has completed filming for a Greek film Home Sweet Home, in which she plays an Indian girl. She had to learn Greek for the film and also dubbed herself. She has two Hindi films, Kusar Prasad Ka Bhoot and Shooter, coming up.

In 2020, she appeared in the Hollywood show  Gown and out in Beverly Hills with Bollywood actor Sammy John Heaney.

Other work

Chandra became the brand ambassador for the Hoop, a Gitanjali brand. She also took part in a commercial for Mysore Sandal Soap. Nitu Chandra also appeared in music director Ismail Darbar's music video "Rasiya Saajan" along with Zubeen Garg. She was also seen in the music video of Bombay Vikings' singer Neeraj Shridhar's hit single "Aa Raha Hoon Main". She also appeared in a successful remix of Sajna Hai Mujhe from D.J. Hot Remix Vol.1 (and the song appeared in 7 other albums after that), and the super hit song Mera Babu Chhail Chhabila (CD - Sophie & Dr.Love, DVD - D. J. Hot Remix Vol.2 & The Return Of Kaanta Mix) alongside Sophie Choudry (the song appeared in 9 other albums after that).

In 2013, Chandra made her debut in theatre, in a play, called Umrao, which featured her in the title role. The Times of India". She has been hosting Rangoli on DD National since May 2017. In 2018, Chandra became Community Ambassador for Patna Pirates in pro kabbadi league.

In the media
In 2008, 7Seas Technologies launched a 3D mobile game, Nitu — The Alien Killer, with Nitu Chandra as the lead character.

Nitu was featured on the cover of the January 2009 issue of Indian Maxim.

Filmography

As Actress

As producer

Television

References

External links

 
 

Actresses in Hindi cinema
Actresses in Tamil cinema
Actresses from Bihar
Living people
Female models from Bihar
Delhi University alumni
Actresses from Patna
Actresses in Telugu cinema
21st-century Indian actresses
Indian film actresses
Indian women film producers
Businesswomen from Bihar
Indraprastha College for Women alumni
Indian female taekwondo practitioners
Year of birth missing (living people)